Roxanna is an unincorporated community in Greene County, in the U.S. state of Ohio.

History
Roxanna was originally called Claysville, and under the latter name was platted in 1845 when the railroad was extended to that point. A post office called Roxanna was established  there in 1887, and remained in operation until 1907.

References

Unincorporated communities in Greene County, Ohio
1887 establishments in Ohio
Populated places established in 1887
Unincorporated communities in Ohio